Jody Stewart Jones (born 17 February 1986) is a Costa Rican footballer.

Club career
Stewart came through the youth ranks at Saprissa and made his senior debut for them in October 2005. He later played for Sagrada Familia.

References

External links
 Profile at Nacion.com 

1986 births
Living people
People from San José, Costa Rica
Association football defenders
Costa Rican footballers
Deportivo Saprissa players